, also credited as , is a Japanese actor and voice actor from Kanagawa Prefecture, Japan. He is represented by Aoni Production.

Filmography

Anime

Video games

Overseas dubbing

Other dubbing

References

External links
 Official agency profile 
 

Year of birth missing (living people)
Living people
Aoni Production voice actors
Japanese male video game actors
Japanese male voice actors
Male voice actors from Kanagawa Prefecture
Tokai University alumni
20th-century Japanese male actors
21st-century Japanese male actors